Soundararajan is a surname. Notable people with the surname include:

 T. M. Soundararajan (1923–2013), Indian singer
 Kannan Soundararajan (born 1973), Indian-American mathematician
 Soundararajan (born 1976), Indian cinematographer
 Tamilisai Soundararajan (born 1961), Indian politician